Son of the Shark (French: Le Fils du Requin) is a 1993 French film directed by Agnes Merlet, about two brothers, Martin (Ludovic Vandendaele) and Simon (Eric Da Silva), and their adventures as juvenile delinquents in the north of France.

Inspired by a well-known passage of Lautréamont's Les Chants de Maldoror, Martin holds a belief, in which he claims to be "the son of a female shark". He hopes that someday he and his brother, Simon will disappear to the bottom of the ocean, where they will live happily ever after surrounded by dancing fish.

Awards and nominations
The film won the 1994 European Film Award for "Young European Film of the Year", the Avignon Film Festival's Prix Tournage, and the Joseph Plateau Award for Best Belgian actress. It was also nominated for César Award for Best Debut.

Cast
 Ludovic Vandendaele as Martin
 Eric Da Silva as Simon
 Sandrine Blancke as Marie
 Maxime Leroux as The father
 Yolande Moreau as The driver
 Olivier Saladin
 Jacques Mathou

References

External links

French crime drama films
1993 films
1990s French-language films
European Film Awards winners (films)
Films directed by Agnès Merlet
Films scored by Bruno Coulais
1990s French films